Gebhard Poltera (November 14, 1923 – November 11, 2008) was an ice hockey player for the Swiss national team. He won a silver medal at the 1948 Winter Olympics.

References

External link
 

1923 births
2008 deaths
EHC Arosa players
Ice hockey players at the 1948 Winter Olympics
Ice hockey players at the 1952 Winter Olympics
Medalists at the 1948 Winter Olympics
Olympic bronze medalists for Switzerland
Olympic ice hockey players of Switzerland
Olympic medalists in ice hockey